The 2003–04 Powergen Cup was the 33rd edition of England's rugby union club competition. Newcastle Falcons won the competition defeating Sale Sharks in the final. The event was sponsored by Powergen and the final was held at Twickenham Stadium.

Draw and results

First round

Second round

Third round

Fourth round

Fifth round

Sixth round

Quarter-finals

Semi-finals

Final

References

2003–04 rugby union tournaments for clubs
2003–04 in English rugby union
2003-04